Fanconi Anemia Opposite Strand Transcript protein is a predicted protein that in humans is encoded by the FANCD2OS gene. The name is derived from mRNA transcribed from the strand complementary to the FANCD2 gene.

Gene
The gene is encoded on Chromosome 3 (human) at p25.3 on the minus strand from 10081320-10108339nt. The primary transcript is 1105nt which codes for a protein of 177 amino acid in length. The gene on the strand complementary to FANCD2 located 5' from CYCSP11 and 3’ from BRK1 and VHL genes.

mRNA 
There are six alternatively spliced transcripts with differences in the 5' and 3' ends as well changes in exon usage. The most common isoform is 1105 bp.

Promoter Region 
The promoter region predicted by the Genomatix El Dorado algorithm spans from 10108742-10108009 bp. Promoters are associated with a wide variety of tissues including B-lymphocyes, germ cells, muscle, neurons & prostate.

Regulatory 
Secondary structure of the 5’ UTR sequence conserved between humans and gibbon contain sequence recognized by to RBMX, Ras & Rab proteins. The sequence for the secondary structure of the 3’ UTR are recognized by EIF4B and RBMX.

Expression 
FANCD2OS is moderately expressed in the human brain, placenta and testes.

Evolutionary History

Protein sequence
The protein from the longest transcript is 177AA in length with a mass of 20188.59kD. The protein consists of a domain of unknown function from the DUF4563 superfamily.

Orthologs
Orthologs of FANCD2OS exist throughout mammals, reptiles, birds and in the cartilaginous fish Australian ghostshark. The protein sequence undergoes mutation at a rate similar to the blood protein fibrinogen.

Paralogs 
FANCD2OS has no known paralogs in Homo sapiens.

References